Ispoinen (Finnish; Ispois in Swedish) is a district in the Uittamo-Skanssi ward of the city of Turku, in Finland. It is located in the southeast of the city, and is mainly a low-density residential area between the more densely built Uittamo and Ilpoinen.

The current population of Ispoinen is 480, and it is decreasing at an annual rate of 0.83%. 17.50% of the district's population are under 15 years old, while 17.08% are over 65. The district's linguistic makeup is 91.88% Finnish, 7.71% Swedish, and 0.42% other.

See also 
 Districts of Turku
 Districts of Turku by population

Districts of Turku